Jan Cornelis ("Jan") de Vries (2 March 1896 in Zwolle – 19 April 1939 in The Hague) was a Dutch athlete, who competed mainly in the 100 metres.

De Vries competed for the Netherlands in the 1924 Summer Olympics held in Paris, France in the 4 x 100 metres relay, where he won the bronze medal with his team mates Jacob Boot, Harry Broos, and Marinus van den Berge.

References 

1896 births
1939 deaths
Dutch male sprinters
Athletes (track and field) at the 1920 Summer Olympics
Athletes (track and field) at the 1924 Summer Olympics
Olympic athletes of the Netherlands
Olympic bronze medalists for the Netherlands
Sportspeople from Zwolle
Medalists at the 1924 Summer Olympics
Olympic bronze medalists in athletics (track and field)